Cornelio Saavedra is a province in the north-eastern parts of the Bolivian Potosí Department. The capital of the province is Betanzos with 4,168 inhabitants in the year 2001.

The province is named after the president of the Argentine First Junta, Cornelio Saavedra, who was born in Otuyo, 	Betanzos Municipality.

Location
Cornelio Saavedra province is one of sixteen provinces in the Potosí Department. It is located between 18° 57' and 19° 44' South and between 64° 48' and 65° 39' West. It borders Chuquisaca Department in the northeast, Chayanta Province in the north, Tomás Frías Province in the west, and José María Linares Province in the south and southeast.

Division
The province comprises three separate municipalities which are further subdivided into cantons.

Population
The main language of the province is Quechua, spoken by 78%, while 47% of the population speaks Spanish. The population increased from 52,659 inhabitants (1992 census) to 58,706 (2001 census), an increase of 11.5%.

80% of the population have no access to electricity, 94% have no sanitary facilities. 69% of the population are employed in agriculture, 1% in mining, 10% in industry, 20% in general services. 89% of the population are Catholics, 8% Protestants.

The people are predominantly indigenous citizens of Quechua descent.

Geography 
The river Pillku Mayu flows along the northern border of the province.

Images

See also 
 Ch'aki Mayu
 Milluni
 Qiñwa Qullu
 Titi Pinkillu
 T'uqu Chaka
 Urqu Qucha
 Wañuma
 Yana Mayu

References 

 

Provinces of Potosí Department